David Goldstein may refer to:

 David Goldstein (blogger), American blogger and former talk radio host
 David Goldstein (Catholic apologist) (1870–1958), Jewish convert to the Roman Catholic Church
 David B. Goldstein (energy policy expert), American energy conservation policy expert
 David B. Goldstein (geneticist), American human geneticist
 Rupert Holmes (born 1947), born David Goldstein, British-American composer, musician and writer